Strękowa Góra  is a village in the administrative district of Gmina Zawady, within Białystok County, Podlaskie Voivodeship, in north-eastern Poland.

The village has a population of 190. It lies on the Narew River.

References

Villages in Białystok County